The Buckingham was an English automobile manufactured by the Buckingham Engineering Company in Coventry from 1914 until 1923.  The company had made cars under the Chota name from 1912.

History
The first cars were a 746 cc cyclecar and a 1492 cc V-twin-engined light car both previously sold as Chotas. The engines were to Buckingham's own design  and were water-cooled.

Production was suspended during World War I and during the conflict Captain Buckingham, the company owner, gained fame as the inventor of the tracer bullet, which was used against airships.

In 1920 he returned to car production with a new model using an air-cooled version of the pre war V-twin engine but now with a capacity of 1096 cc, a two-speed gearbox and belt drive to the rear axle. A three-speed gearbox was fitted from 1922 with shaft drive and a rear axle incorporating a differential. Front suspension was by a transverse leaf spring and the rear by quarter elliptic leaf springs. The two-seat bodies were made by the coachbuilder Charlesworth.

A coupé version was called the "Palace".

From 1922 to 1923 manufacture of the car was undertaken by Alvis but it is estimated that they only made about 30 of the cars.

Popular culture
Ozzie and Harriet, The Buckingham, season 7, episode 32, May 20, 1959 Ricky and David buy one and later regret the high costs..

See also
 List of car manufacturers of the United Kingdom

References

Other sources
David Burgess Wise, The New Illustrated Encyclopedia of Automobiles.

External links
November 1919 advertisement

Defunct motor vehicle manufacturers of the United Kingdom
Cyclecars